Thysbina bicostata is a species of leaf beetle of the Democratic Republic of the Congo, described by Julius Weise in 1902.

References

Eumolpinae
Beetles of the Democratic Republic of the Congo
Taxa named by Julius Weise
Beetles described in 1902
Endemic fauna of the Democratic Republic of the Congo